Arnfinn Nesset (born 25 October 1936) is a Norwegian former nurse and nursing home manager and a convicted serial killer. His crimes include the murders of at least 22 people, as well as attempted murder, document forgery, and embezzlement. He may have murdered up to 138 people. In 1983, he was convicted of poisoning 22 patients and sentenced to 21 years in prison. He served 12 years and 10 years supervision and is thought to be living under an assumed name.

Early life
Born in Trøndelag in 1936 out of wedlock, Nesset was raised by his mother, remained with her throughout his upbringing and adulthood, and lived at her childhood home. His father was absent from his life and never established contact with him. He was educated as a registered nurse and by 1977 had been hired as a head nurse at a larger nursing home in Orkdal, Sør-Trøndelag.

Crimes
During the summer and the autumn of 1981, a series of suspicious deaths was uncovered at the nursing home in Orkdal in which Nesset was the manager. When questioned by police, Nesset initially confessed to the murders of 27 patients, whom he claimed to have killed by injecting them with suxamethonium chloride, a drug to paralyze muscles. He was charged with 25 counts of homicide but later retracted his confession and denied all charges for the rest of his five-month trial.

Trial
Nesset was convicted in March 1983 of poisoning 22 patients with suxamethonium chloride. He was also convicted of one count of attempted murder and acquitted on two other counts. Nesset may have killed as many as 138 of his patients.

He was sentenced to 21 years in prison, the maximum term then available under Norwegian law, to be followed by ten years of preventative detention. However, he was released after serving 12 years of the sentence for good behaviour and 10 years of supervision. He is now reported to be living in an undisclosed location under an assumed name.

The chief prosecutor at his trial, Olaf Jakhelln described Nesset as "an ambitious man, who wanted complete control over life and death [of his victims]."

See also
Anders Hansson, a nursing aid who committed similar murders at a nursing home in Malmö, Sweden, during roughly the same time.
John Bodkin Adams
Harold Shipman
Stephan Letter
List of serial killers by country
List of serial killers by number of victims

References

1936 births
20th-century Norwegian criminals
Living people
Male serial killers
Medical serial killers
Norwegian male criminals
Norwegian nurses
Norwegian people convicted of murder
Norwegian serial killers
Nurses convicted of killing patients
People convicted of murder by Norway
Poisoners